A Description of Millenium Hall and the Country Adjacent is a 1762 novel by Sarah Scott.

Content

 was Scott's most significant novel.  It was popular enough to go into four editions by 1778, and interest in it has revived in the 21st century among feminist literary scholars.  The book takes the form of a frame tale and a series of adventures, as the narrator's long-lost cousin relates how each of the residents arrived at the female utopia, Millenium Hall.  The adventures are remarkable for their reliance on a nearly superstitious form of divine grace, where God's will manifests itself with the direct punishment of the wicked and the miraculous protection of the innocent.  In one tale, a woman about to be ravished by a man is saved, literally by the hand of God, as her attacker dies of a stroke.  The Hall the characters live in is a model of mid-century reform ideas.  All the women have crafts with which to better themselves.  Property is held in common, and education is the primary pastime.

Elizabeth Montagu, Sarah Scott's sister, had become a leader of the bluestockings, a coterie of reform-minded individuals.  They believed in female equality, education, and limited economic justice.  They were also active in prison and health care reform.  Although Elizabeth may be lightly satirized in the figure of Lady Brumpton in Millenium Hall, the Hall is a fictional embodiment of bluestocking ideals.

At the same time, there is a notable critique of heterosexual sexuality in Millenium Hall. This antipathy is usually expressed in religious terms, as all of the sexual acts in the novel are either forms of rape or sin.  Further, the characters in the novel who are married or who have children are so without any indication of romantic love between the partners.  Instead of romantic love, the novel posits female friendship under a powerful duty to piety.  Female friendship is constant, but it is also emphatically antiseptic by being non-sexual.

Reception
Although Millenium Hall has received renewed attention, it is not a novel that participates in the tradition of the novel in general as traditionally defined by scholarship.  Sarah Scott's novel is not primarily interested in character (as Samuel Richardson's had been or Frances Burney's would be) or social act (as Henry Fielding's had been) or entertainment (as Aphra Behn's had been).  Instead, her novel is directed toward morality, example, and, to some degree, a polemic of female education.  It seeks to reform the individual female who might the novel and engage the male reader in pity.  As the subtitle to the novel says, it contains "Anecdotes and Reflections as May excite in the Reader proper Sentiments of Humanity, and lead the Mind to the Love of VIRTUE," with 'virtue' being understood in its masculine (virtus) and feminine (virginity) senses.

References

External links
 

1762 novels
1760s fantasy novels